Samifin (or SRF ) is the Malagasy Financial Intelligence unit, and acts as an independent body in Madagascar.  Founded on July 18, 2008, it is based upon Law 2004-020 (August 19, 2004), which details the tracking and confiscation of illegal products, and Decree 2007-510 (June 4, 2007), which details the creation, organization, and operation of the organization.  Its objectives are to clean up the financial sector in Madagascar and combat transnational illegal operations.

External links
 Samifin (official website)

Economy of Madagascar
Government of Madagascar